This was the first edition of the tournament.

Gao Xin and Zhang Zhizhen won the title after defeating Chen Ti and Yi Chu-huan 6–2, 6–3 in the final.

Seeds

Draw

References
 Main Draw

International Challenger Zhangjiagang - Doubles
2017 Doubles